Twomile Branch is a stream in Montgomery County in the U.S. state of Missouri. It is a tributary of Elkhorn Creek.

See also
List of rivers of Missouri

References

Rivers of Montgomery County, Missouri
Rivers of Missouri